Chicago is an American rock band formed in 1967 in Chicago, Illinois. The self-described "rock and roll band with horns" began as a politically charged, sometimes experimental, rock band and later moved to a predominantly softer sound, generating several hit ballads. The group had a steady stream of hits throughout the 1970s and 1980s. Second only to The Beach Boys in Billboard singles and albums chart success among American bands, Chicago is one of the longest-running and most successful rock groups, and one of the world's best-selling groups of all time, having sold more than 100 million records.

According to Billboard, Chicago was the leading US singles charting group during the 1970s. They have sold over 40 million units in the US, with 23 gold, 18 platinum, and 8 multi-platinum albums. Over the course of their career they have had five number-one albums and 21 top-ten singles. They were inducted into the Rock and Roll Hall of Fame on April 8, 2016 at Barclays Center in Brooklyn, New York.

Albums

Canon albums

Notes:

 Studio albums

 Live albums

 Compilation albums

 Box sets

Other albums
Live albums
 1972: Live in Japan
 2015: Chicago at Symphony Hall
 2018: Chicago: VI Decades Live (This is What We Do) (box set)
 2018: Chicago: Chicago II Live on Soundstage
 2018: Chicago: Greatest Hits Live
 2018: Chicago: Live at the Isle of Wight Festival

Compilation albums
 1983: If You Leave Me Now
 1984: The Ultimate Collection
 1985: Take Me Back to Chicago
 1991: Group Portrait
 1995: Overtime
 1995: 25 Years of Gold – AUS #30
 1996: The Very Best of Chicago
 1997: Chicago Presents the Innovative Guitar of Terry Kath
 2013: Chicago Collectors Edition (3 CD set from Madacy Records)

Unauthorized releases
In 1969,  Chicago appeared at the Toronto Rock and Roll Revival, the same one day rock festival that produced John Lennon's Live Peace in Toronto 1969. (Also appearing at the Festival were Alice Cooper, Bo Diddley and Chuck Berry - whose performances of the event were also issued on albums.) Since 1978, there have been innumerable unauthorized LP, Cassette and CD releases of the same poor-quality recording of this performance.

There were eight songs recorded at the gig, seven from Chicago Transit Authority plus the then unreleased "25 or 6 to 4." Almost all of these releases include only seven of the songs; "Beginnings" is nearly always omitted, its title often being wrongly given to the first track "Introduction". "South California Purples" is often listed as "Purples," "Purple Song" or "South Carolina Purples", and sometimes given an incorrect writing credit—i.e., to composer Carl Michalski or "John Gunner/J.Marks".

The one song in the set not to appear previously on any official live album is "Liberation", which is frequently edited or faded early and whose correct total runtime is approximately 16:05. On some versions, all the songs are faded early. Some LP versions include talking between songs, most notably Lamm pointing out that "25 or 6 to 4" was a brand new song.

Despite its shortcomings, some reviewers have regarded the recording quite positively.  For example, the 1984 LP release Chicago: Toronto Rock 'n' Roll Revival 69 by Design Records is considered by reviewer Doug Stone to be a "choice concert souvenir...captur(ing) the group in its live prime. Supporting the Chicago Transit Authority debut, before mastering wedding material, Chicago was a rock & roll force to be reckoned with." A reviewer of an earlier version of same recording, entitled Toronto Rock 'n' Roll Revival 1969, Volume 1 (Accord, 1981) considers that "...there's certainly nothing wrong with the performance. In some ways, the at times fuzzy sound works in the album's favor, giving Chicago a garage-y edge rarely found on their studio works."

Singles

 "Street Player" peaked at #91 on the US R&B chart in December 1979.
 The #59 peak of "Here in My Heart" was on the Hot 100 Airplay chart. The record was not eligible for the Hot 100 at the time, not being released as a retail single.

Billboard and Cash Box year-end performances

Other appearances

Videos

Music videos

Notes

References

Discographies of American artists
Rock music group discographies